Pawishiana (Pauixiana) is an extinct Cariban language in the Paravilyana subgroup.

References

Languages of Brazil
Cariban languages